Tygarts Valley Church, also known as Tygarts Valley Presbyterian Church, is a Presbyterian church on U.S. Routes 219/250 in Huttonsville, Randolph County, West Virginia. It was built in 1883 in a wooden Gothic Revival architectural style on a sandstone foundation. The church measures  and features a  spire.

It was listed on the National Register of Historic Places in 1986.

The Philadelphia architectural firm of Isaac Purcell designed the building. Bridge builder Lemuel Chenoweth was responsible for the construction. The colorful windows, are rolled cathedral glass, imported from Scotland.

References

Churches on the National Register of Historic Places in West Virginia
Presbyterian churches in West Virginia
Gothic Revival church buildings in West Virginia
Churches completed in 1883
19th-century Presbyterian church buildings in the United States
Buildings and structures in Randolph County, West Virginia
National Register of Historic Places in Randolph County, West Virginia
U.S. Route 250